Martijn Bernard Katan (born 1946) is a Dutch nutritionist, an emeritus professor at the Vrije Universiteit Amsterdam and author of two popular science books on nutrition.

Career
Katan was born in Arnhem in 1946. He studied chemistry and biochemistry at the University of Amsterdam. He obtained his PhD in molecular biology in 1977 under Piet Borst from the same university. Katan started working at Wageningen University in 1976 where he researched "Nutrition and risk factors for cardiovascular disease". In 1998, he was appointed professor of human nutrition at the university. He was also the "Nutrition Foundation Professor" at the University of Nijmegen from 1985 to 1998. Between 1998 and 2003 he was scientific director of the Nutrition and Health program of the Wageningen Centre for Food Sciences.

In 2003 Katan became a member of the Royal Netherlands Academy of Arts and Sciences. In 2005 he moved from Wageningen University to the Vrije Universiteit Amsterdam where he was appointed professor of nutrition. Katan is a member of the Dutch Health Council.

He took up emeritus status in 2011.

Research
Katan's research focuses on the relationship between nutrients and their effects on the heart. Katan gained notoriety for his research on cholesterol and trans-fats. He demonstrated, among other things, that boiled coffee creates a cholesterol burden that filtered coffee does not. His research on the harmful effects of trans-fatty acids has encouraged the food industry to minimize the use of trans-fats in the food supply.

Honors and awards

 2001: The Epstein Award; American Heart Association Council on Epidemiology 
 2003: European Nutrition Award; Federation of European Nutrition Sciences. 
 2004: European Lipid Science Award; European Federation for the Science and Technology of Lipids.
 2005:, named by the Thomson Society (formerly the Institute for Scientific Information) as a Highly Cited Researcher "in the art of Agricultural Science," which means that he is among the 250 most cited scientists in that field

Bibliography
What is Healthy?: Myths and Facts About Nutrition (2008). Uitgeverij Bert Bakker.  (Edition 1) &  (Edition 2)Voedingsmythes. Over valse hoop en nodeloze vrees''. (2016). Uitgeverij Bert Bakker.

References

External links

1946 births
Living people
Dutch biochemists
Dutch health and wellness writers
Dutch nutritionists
Food scientists
Members of the Royal Netherlands Academy of Arts and Sciences
People from Arnhem
Academic staff of Radboud University Nijmegen
University of Amsterdam alumni
Academic staff of Vrije Universiteit Amsterdam
Academic staff of Wageningen University and Research